Miriam D'Agostini (born 15 August 1978) is a former professional Brazilian tennis player.

In her career, she won eight singles titles and 15 doubles titles on the ITF Women's Circuit. On 10 September 2000, she reached her best singles ranking of world number 188. On 10 September 2000, she peaked at number 159 in the WTA doubles rankings.

Playing for Brazil Fed Cup team, D'Agostini has a win–loss record of 13–12.

ITF finals

Singles: 16 (8 titles, 8 runner-ups)

Doubles: 36 (15 titles, 21 runner-ups)

References

External links
 
 
 

1978 births
Brazilian female tennis players
Living people
Olympic tennis players of Brazil
Tennis players at the 1996 Summer Olympics
Sportspeople from Rio Grande do Sul
20th-century Brazilian women
21st-century Brazilian women